List of people with the surnames MacCauley and McCauley:

Alyn McCauley, (born 1977), Canadian, professional ice hockey player
Barbara McCauley, American, romance novelist
Clark McCauley, psychologist
Dan McCauley, businessman
Dana McCauley, chef and corporate food consultant
Deon McCaulay, Belizean footballer
Don McCauley, American football player
Gary McCauley, Canadian politician
Jack McCauley, American inventor and engineer 
Jim McCauley (1863–1930), American baseball player
John McCauley, Royal Australian Air Force Air Marshal, KBE, CB.
Johnny McCauley, Irish singer/songwriter
Joseph L. McCauley, professor of physics
Leland McCauley, fictional comic book character
Marcus McCauley, American football player
Matthew McCauley (disambiguation), several people
Matthew McCauley (politician), (1850–1930), Canadian politician.
Matthew McCauley (producer), (born 1954), Canadian, composer and record producer.
Maurice J. McCauley (1923-2013), American politician
Peter McCauley, New Zealand actor
Rosa McCauley Parks (Rosa Parks), an activist in the civil rights movement best known for her pivotal role in the Montgomery Bus Boycott.
Samuel McCauley (died 1919), Comptroller General of NSW Prisons, Australia, introduced the world's first comprehensive identification system for prisoners using fingerprinting.
Stephen McCauley, American novelist
Sue McCauley (born 1941), New Zealand writer
Vincent J. McCauley (1906-1982), American Bishop
Wes McCauley, hockey referee
William J. McCauley (1900-1964), American politician
Josef D. McCauley (2004-Present), British Sociologist

See also
List of people with the surnames Macaulay, MacAulay, and McAulay

Lists of people by surname